Lee Joo-young (born April 24, 1987) is a South Korean actress. She is best known for her role as Song Hye-ri in the tvN series Live.

Filmography

Film

Television series

Web series

Awards and nominations

References

External links
 
 

1987 births
21st-century South Korean actresses
South Korean film actresses
South Korean television actresses
People from Busan
Living people